Beyerville is a census-designated place (CDP) in Santa Cruz County, Arizona, United States. The population was 177 at the 2010 census.

Geography
Beyerville is located along the Santa Cruz River. Arizona State Route 82 passes through the community.

Demographics

Beyerville first appeared on the 2010 U.S. Census as a census-designated place (CDP). It was not a new place then, as it had had a school built in 1921.

See also

 Little Red Schoolhouse

References

Census-designated places in Santa Cruz County, Arizona
Populated places in the Sonoran Desert